R. T. Greer and Company may refer to:

R. T. Greer and Company (Pikeville, Kentucky), listed on the National Register of Historic Places in Pike County, Kentucky
R. T. Greer and Company Root and Herb Warehouse, Todd, North Carolina, listed on the National Register of Historic Places in Ashe County, North Carolina
R. T. Greer and Company (Marion, Virginia), listed on the National Register of Historic Places in Smyth County, Virginia